The 1984 Tel Aviv Open was a men's tennis tournament played on hard courts that was part of the 1984 Volvo Grand Prix. It was played at the Israel Tennis Centers in the Tel Aviv District city of Ramat HaSharon, Israel from September 10 through September 17, 1984. It was the fifth edition of the tournament. First-seeded Aaron Krickstein won the singles title.

Finals

Singles

 Aaron Krickstein defeated  Shahar Perkiss 6–4, 6–1 
 It was Krickstein's 2nd title of the year and the 3rd of his career.

Doubles

 Peter Doohan /  Brian Levine defeated  Colin Dowdeswell /  Jakob Hlasek 6–3, 6–4 
 It was Doohan's 2nd title of the year and the 2nd of his career. It was Levine's 2nd title of the year and the 2nd of his career.

References

External links
 ITF tournament edition details

 
Tel Aviv Open
Tel Aviv Open
Tel Aviv Open